The 2016 Tianjin Open was a women's professional tennis tournament played on hard courts. It was 3rd edition of the tournament, and part of the 2016 WTA Tour. It took place in Tianjin, China between 10 and 16 October 2016.

Points and prize money

Point distribution

Prize money

1 Qualifiers prize money is also the Round of 32 prize money
* per team

Singles main-draw entrants

Seeds 

 1 Rankings are as of October 3, 2016

Other entrants 

The following players received wildcards into the singles main draw:
 Peng Shuai 
 Wang Yafan 
 Xu Yifan

The following players received entry from the qualifying draw:
 Chang Kai-chen
 Andrea Hlaváčková
 Lucie Hradecká
 Liu Fangzhou
 Shelby Rogers
 Nina Stojanović

Withdrawals 
Before the tournament
  Timea Bacsinszky → replaced by  Han Xinyun
  Irina-Camelia Begu → replaced by  Evgeniya Rodina
  Hsieh Su-wei → replaced by  Duan Yingying
  Mirjana Lučić-Baroni → replaced by  Zhang Kailin
During the tournament
  Agnieszka Radwańska
  Zhang Shuai

Doubles main-draw entrants

Seeds 

1 Rankings are as of October 3, 2016

Other entrants
The following pairs received a wildcard into the doubles main draw:
  Kang Jiaqi /  Liu Fangzhou
  Gao Xinyu /  Zhang Ying

Champions

Singles 

 Peng Shuai def.  Alison Riske, 7–6(7–3), 6−2

Doubles 

  Christina McHale /  Peng Shuai def.  Magda Linette /  Xu Yifan, 7–6(10–8), 6−0

External links 
 

Tianjin Open
Tianjin Open
Tianjin Open